The 1987 New York Mets season was the 26th regular season for the Mets. The Mets entered the season as the defending World Series champions.  They went 92–70 and finished 2nd in the NL East. They were managed by Davey Johnson. The team played home games at Shea Stadium.

Offseason

 November 12, 1986: Ron Gardenhire was traded by the Mets to the Minnesota Twins for a player to be named later. The Twins completed the deal by sending Dominic Iasparro (minors) to the Mets on April 4, 1987.
 December 9, 1986: Heathcliff Slocumb was drafted from the Mets by the Chicago Cubs in the 1986 minor league draft.
 December 11, 1986: Kevin Mitchell, Stan Jefferson, Shawn Abner, Kevin Armstrong (minors) and Kevin Brown (minors) were traded by the Mets to the San Diego Padres for Kevin McReynolds, Gene Walter, and Adam Ging (minors).
 December 17, 1986: Doug Gwosdz was traded by the Mets to the Seattle Mariners for Ricky Nelson.
 February 9, 1987: Clint Hurdle was signed as a free agent by the Mets.
 March 27, 1987: Ed Hearn, Rick Anderson, and Mauro Gozzo were traded by the Mets to the Kansas City Royals for David Cone and Chris Jelic.

Regular season
June 5, 1987: A mock ceremony called "Spider-Man's wedding" took place to promote a special wedding issue of the Amazing Spider-Man comic book at home plate in front of more than 45,000 fans just before the New York Mets played the Pittsburgh Pirates. Actors portrayed as fictional comic book characters Spider-Man and Mary Jane Watson (wearing a wedding gown designed by Willi Smith), participated in the ceremony. Stan Lee, publisher of Marvel Comics and co-creator of Spider-Man officiated the ceremony prior to the Mets match.

Standings

Record vs. opponents

Milestones
 Howard Johnson became the eighth member of the 30–30 club by hitting for at least 30 home runs and getting at least 30 stolen bases in the same season. Johnson was the first infielder to join the 30–30 club.
 Darryl Strawberry became the second Met in the season and the tenth member overall of the 30–30 club

Notable transactions
 May 11, 1987: Ricky Nelson was traded by the Mets to the Cleveland Indians for Don Schulze.
 June 2, 1987: 1987 Major League Baseball Draft
Todd Hundley was drafted by the Mets in the 2nd round. Player signed June 15, 1987.
Eric Hillman was drafted by the New York Mets in the 16th round of the 1987 amateur draft. Player signed June 5, 1987.
Anthony Young was drafted by the Mets in the 38th round. Player signed June 6, 1987.
 September 15, 1987: Jeff Richardson and Shane Young (minors) were traded by the Mets to the California Angels for John Candelaria.

Roster

Player stats

Batting

Starters by position
Note: Pos = Position; G = Games played; AB = At bats; H = Hits; Avg. = Batting average; HR = Home runs; RBI = Runs batted in

Other batters
Note: G = Games played; AB = At bats; H = Hits; Avg. = Batting average; HR = Home runs; RBI = Runs batted in

Pitching

Starting pitchers
Note: G = Games pitched; IP = Innings pitched; W = Wins; L = Losses; ERA = Earned run average; SO = Strikeouts

Other pitchers
Note: G = Games pitched; IP = Innings pitched; W = Wins; L = Losses; ERA = Earned run average; SO = Strikeouts

Relief pitchers
Note: G = Games pitched; W = Wins; L = Losses; SV = Saves; ERA = Earned run average; SO = Strikeouts

Awards and honors
 Darryl Strawberry – Player of the Month, September 1987
All-Star Game

Farm system

References

External links
1987 New York Mets at Baseball Almanac
1987 New York Mets at Baseball Reference
1987 New York Mets schedule and stats at MLB.com
The 1987 New York Mets at Retrosheet

New York Mets seasons
New York Mets
New York Mets
1980s in Queens